Snow Angels is a 10-part comic miniseries created by writer Jeff Lemire and artist Jock, published by comiXology. The series focuses on two girls, Milliken (age 12) and Mae (age eight), as they struggle to survive in a frozen wasteland, hunted by the mysterious "Snowman".

Publication history
The series was originally teased in late October 2020 via various social media channels with a video revealing only the title of the project,the creators' names, and the publisher. A full announcement followed in mid November. The series debuted digitally as a part of the comiXology Originals line with Dark Horse Comics printing the book later. In tandem with the release of Snow Angels #1, Amazon released "Snow Angels: A Short Story", written by Lemire, on Kindle and Audible (narrated by Jennifer Ikeda).

Reception
Many reviewers praised the first issue for its design and intriguing premise, though some criticized it as being overly familiar, especially in Adventures in Poor Taste's review. Over time, the reviews for the series trended upwards, with the central mystery commonly cited as a major part of the appeal. In 2022, Snow Angels was awarded the Eisner Award for Best Digital Comic.

References

2021 comics debuts
2021 comics endings
Comics by Jeff Lemire